Atsushi Maekawa (Japanese: 前川 淳, Hepburn: Maekawa Atsushi, born July 7, 1964) is a Japanese anime and tokusatsu scriptwriter, best known for his work in Dragon Ball Z and Dragon Ball GT and for being the father of anime voice actress Ryōko Maekawa.

Filmography

Screenwriter

Anime series 

 Afterschool Dice Club (12 episodes) (2019)
 Yu-Gi-Oh! Vrains (24 episodes) (2017-2019)
 Yu-Gi-Oh! Arc-V (2014 - 2017)
 Otaku Teacher (2015)
 Meganebu! (3 episodes) (2013)
 Hunter x Hunter (4 episodes) (2011)
 Bakugan Battle Brawlers: Gundalian Invaders (2019 - 2011)
 Jewelpet (2009 - 2010)
 Bakugan Battle Brawlers: New Vestroia (2009 - 2010)
 Fresh Pretty Cure! (composition - 50 episodes, screenplay - 11 episodes) (2009 - 2010)
 Bakugan Battle Brawlers (composition - 53 episodes) (2007 - 2009)
 Wellber no Monogatari: Sisters of Wellber Dai Ni Maku (2008)
 Dinosaur King D-Kids Adventure: Pterosaur Legend (7 episodes) (2008)
 Dinosaur King (5 episodes) (2007 - 2008)
 Eyeshield 21 (12 episodes) (2005 - 2008)
 Dragonaut: The Resonance (story concept - 17 episodes, screenplay - 5 episodes (2007 - 2008)
 Yu-Gi-Oh!: Duel Monsters GX (5 episodes) (2004 - 2008)
 Wellber no Monogatari: Sisters of Wellber (2007)
 Onegai My Melody: Kurukuru Shuffle! (9 episodes) (2006 - 2007)
 Capeta (9 episodes) (2005 - 2006)
 Mahou Sentai Magiranger (13 episodes) (2005)
 Prince of Tennis (2 episodi) (2001 - 2005)
 Bakuryuu Sentai Abaranger (8 episodes) (2003 - 2004)
 Yu-Gi-Oh!: Duel Monsters (2 episodes) (2000 - 2004)
 Ninpuu Sentai Hurricaneger (9 episodes) (2002 - 2003)
 Get Backers (4 episodes) (2002 - 2003)
 Bomberman Jetters (2002 - 2003)
 Digimon Tamers (11 episodes) (2001 - 2002)
 Ask Dr. Rin! (51 episodes) (2001 - 2002)
 Medarot (12 episodes) (2000 - 2001)
 Digimon Adventure 02 (2000 - 2001)
 Ojamajo Doremi  (1999 - 2000)
 Digimon (18 episodes) (1999 - 2000)
 Masked Angel Rosetta (2 episodes) (1998)
 Dragon Ball GT (28 episodes) (1996 - 1997)
 Sailor Moon (5 episodes) (1996 - 1997)
 Dragon Ball Z (13 episodes) (1995 - 1996)

OVA 

 Air Gear: Kuro no Hane to Nemuri no Mori - Break on the Sky (3 episodes) (2010 - 2011)
 Dragon Ball GT: A Hero's Legacy (1997)

Anime movies 

 Lupin III vs. Detective Conan: The Movie (2013)
 Eiga Furesshu Purikyua! Omocha no Kuni wa himitsu ga ippai!? (2009)
 Lupin III: Angel Tactics (2005)
 The Prince of Tennis: Two Samurais, the First Game (2005)
 Digimon Adventure 3D: Digimon Grand Prix! (2000)

Songwriter 
For the anime series Ultimate Otaku Teacher, he wrote the lyrics for the songs composed by Ryuuichi Takada:

 Futari - sung by Satsumi Matsuda
 Itoshi no Shy Boy - sung by Satsumi Matsuda
 Kazoku no Kizuna da Familia - sung by Satsumi Matsuda
 Kazoku no Kizuna da Familia - sung by Risae Matsuda
 Maid no Hinkaku - sung by Azusa Tadokoro
 Metal Beast Rockunger! - sung by Shiina Natsukawa
 Yume Miru Two Hand - sung by Sora Amamiya

Notes

External links 
 
 
 
 Atsushi Maekawa, at Animeclick.it (in Italian)
 Atsushi Maekawa, at Tvdrama-db.com (in Japanese)

Anime screenwriters

1964 births

Living people
Japanese lyricists